"Ace in the Hole" is a popular song composed by Cole Porter. The song was written expressly for Porter's musical Let's Face It! which debuted at New York City's Imperial Theatre on 29 October 1941. In the original production, "Ace in the Hole" was performed by Mary Jane Walsh (as Winnie Potter) and Nanette Fabray (as Jean Blanchard). The song was one of the hits of the show throughout its 547 performances on Broadway and its 1943 movie adaptation.

Copyright status
The song was copyrighted in 1941 by the music publisher Chappell & Co. which transferred the renewed copyright to John F. Wharton, Trustee of the Cole Porter Musical & Literary Property Trusts.

Notable recordings
Ella Fitzgerald - Ella Fitzgerald Sings the Cole Porter Songbook (1956)
Mabel Mercer - Sings Cole Porter (1955)
Johnny Mathis - Live It Up! (1961)
Joel Grey - Only the Beginning (1967)/Black Sheep Boy (1969)

References

Notes

Songs from Let's Face It!
Songs written by Cole Porter
1941 songs